A Flor de Piel is 1974 album by Julio Iglesias. The LP was released in the United States in October 1974. A month later, Billboard noted major sales of the album in Miami, New York, Chicago and Puerto Rico.

Track listing

Certifications and sales

References

Sources and external links
 Julio Iglesias Discography

1974 albums
Julio Iglesias albums
Spanish-language albums